Iroda Tulyaganova was the defending champions, but did not compete this year.

Myriam Casanova won the title by defeating Arantxa Sánchez Vicario 4–6, 6–2, 6–1 in the final.

Seeds

Draw

Finals

Top half

Bottom half

References

External links
 Official results archive (ITF)
 Official results archive (WTA)

WTA Knokke-Heist
2002 WTA Tour